In chronobiology, an infradian rhythm is a rhythm with a period longer than the period of a circadian rhythm, i.e., with a frequency of less than one cycle in 24 hours. Some examples of infradian rhythms in mammals include menstruation, breeding, migration, hibernation, molting and fur or hair growth, and tidal or seasonal rhythms. In contrast, ultradian rhythms have periods shorter than the period of a circadian rhythm. Several infradian rhythms are known to be caused by hormone stimulation or exogenous factors. For example, seasonal depression, an example of an infradian rhythm occurring once a year, can be caused by the systematic lowering of light levels during the winter.

See also
 Photoperiodicity

References

Chronobiology